Casimir Pfyffer von Altishofen (10 October 1794, in Rome – 11 November 1875) was a Swiss politician and jurist. He was mayor of Lucerne (1832–1835), President of the Swiss National Council (1854/1855) and five times President of the Federal Supreme Court.

Kasimir-Pfyffer-Strasse in Lucerne is named for him.

Works
 
 
 Der Kanton Luzern historisch-geographisch-statistisch geschildert ; ein Hand- und Hausbuch für Jedermann. 2 volumes, St. Gallen: Huber 1858/59.

External links 
 
 
 
 

1794 births
1875 deaths
Swiss Roman Catholics
Members of the National Council (Switzerland)
Presidents of the National Council (Switzerland)
Mayors of places in Switzerland